The Terrestrial Wideband Network was a DARPA-sponsored experimental network designed to support research in high-speed networking protocols and distributed multimedia applications. It was built and operated by BBN Technologies from May 1989 to about 1991; although originally planned to turn into the Defense Research Internet, it instead evolved into the Defense Simulation Internet.

The Terrestrial Wideband Network was a trans-continental network implemented via Wideband Packet Switches (based on BBN Butterfly parallel computers) connected by T1 circuits. It replaced the 3 megabit/second Satellite Wideband Network, which had been in operation for the previous 8 years. Because it was based on a single cross-country T1 trunk from the DARPA National Networking Testbed (NNT), the Terrestrial Wideband Network's topology was linear, i.e., a  series  of  packet switches connected in a line by T1 trunks. Each T1 link ran at 1.544 megabits per second.

The Terrestrial Wideband Network provided standard Internet Protocol transport, but also multicast services and the experimental, connection-oriented Internet Stream Protocol (ST-II). Individual host computers could gain access to ST-II features via the Host Access Protocol (HAP), specified in RFC 907-A. Internally, the network was based on the Dual Bus Protocol (DBP), a descendant of the QPSX protocol proposed as the IEEE 802.6 Metropolitan Area Network (MAN) standard, enhanced to provide bandwidth reservations with access fairness, and to operate over long distances.

References 
 "Terrestrial Wideband Network (DRI)", Katy Yoon, in The User's Directory of Computer Networks, ed. Tracy Laquey, Digital Press, pages 222-224, 1990.
 "The DARPA wideband network protocol", W. Edmond, K. Leib, C. Topolcic, ACM SIGCOMM '90 Proceedings of the ACM symposium on Communications architectures & protocols, pages 79-89.
 "Terrestrial Wideband Network", NSF Network Service Center (NNSC), Section 5.21, September 27, 1989.
 Distributed Interactive Simulation of Combat, Office of Technology Assessment, DIANE Publishing Company, 1996, page 27.

DARPA
Wide area networks
History of telecommunications in the United States